This is a list of properties and districts in Tattnall County, Georgia that are listed on the National Register of Historic Places (NRHP).

Current listings

|}

References

Tattnall
Tattnall County, Georgia